Romm or Romme may refer to:

Surnames 
Romm
Giora Romm (born 1945), Israeli Air Force general
Joseph J. Romm (born 1960), American author, blogger, physicist and climate expert 
Mikhail Romm (1891–1967), Soviet football player
Mikhail Romm (1901–1971), Soviet film director
Nic Romm (born 1974), German actor
Oskar Romm (1919–1993), German Luftwaffe ace
Robin Romm, American writer

Romme
Georges Romme (born 1960), Dutch organizational theorist 
Gianni Romme  (born 1973), Dutch long-distance runner and speed skater
Gilbert Romme (1750–1795), French politician and mathematician
Marius Romme  (born 1934), Dutch psychiatrist

Other 
 Rommé, the most popular form of the card game, Rummy, in Germany and Austria

See also
Romm publishing house
Rommel (disambiguation)